Megacyllene robusta is a species of beetle in the family Cerambycidae. It was described by Linsley and Chemsak in 1963, and occurs in Arizona.

References

Megacyllene
Beetles described in 1963